Bob and Mike Bryan were the two-time defending champions but lost in the final to Julien Benneteau and Nenad Zimonjić 6–4, 6–7(4–7), [12–14].

Seeds
All seeds received a bye into the second round.

Draw

Finals

Top half

Bottom half

References
 Main Draw

2013 Monte-Carlo Rolex Masters